Live at the Bowery Poetry Project is a collaborative album by Lance Carter, Bill Laswell and Robert Musso. It was released on September 1, 2007 by Musso Music.

Track listing

Personnel 
Adapted from the Live at the Bowery Poetry Project liner notes.
Lance Carter – drums
Bill Laswell – bass guitar
Robert Musso – guitar, producer

Release history

References

External links 
 

2007 live albums
Collaborative albums
Bill Laswell live albums
Robert Musso albums
Albums produced by Robert Musso